Garden Township is a civil township of Delta County in the U.S. state of Michigan.  As of the 2010 census, the township had a total population of 750, down from 817 at the 2000 census. In 2012, it became home to the first wind farm in the Upper Peninsula, the 28 MW Garden Wind Farm.

Communities
The Village of Garden is located within the township.

Geography
The township occupies the northern portion of the Garden Peninsula, with the Big Bay de Noc, which opens onto Green Bay on the west and Lake Michigan on the east. The township also extends about  northward along the entire eastern boundary between Delta County and Schoolcraft County to the northern boundary of Delta with Schoolcraft.

The total area is 13.27% water.

Climate

Demographics
As of the census of 2000, there were 817 people, 348 households, and 249 families residing in the township.  The population density was 5.1 per square mile (2.0/km2).  There were 654 housing units at an average density of 4.1 per square mile (1.6/km2).  The racial makeup of the township was 88.25% White, 0.12% African American, 5.75% Native American, 0.37% Asian, and 5.51% from two or more races. Hispanic or Latino of any race were 0.86% of the population.

There were 348 households, out of which 24.7% had children under the age of 18 living with them, 62.9% were married couples living together, 5.2% had a female householder with no husband present, and 28.2% were non-families. 24.4% of all households were made up of individuals, and 12.6% had someone living alone who was 65 years of age or older.  The average household size was 2.35 and the average family size was 2.74.

In the township the population was spread out, with 22.2% under the age of 18, 3.1% from 18 to 24, 24.2% from 25 to 44, 31.7% from 45 to 64, and 18.8% who were 65 years of age or older.  The median age was 46 years. For every 100 females, there were 106.8 males.  For every 100 females age 18 and over, there were 103.8 males.

The median income for a household in the township was $37,083, and the median income for a family was $40,313. Males had a median income of $34,750 versus $29,063 for females. The per capita income for the township was $20,445.  About 5.4% of families and 9.1% of the population were below the poverty line, including 9.9% of those under age 18 and 9.7% of those age 65 or over.

See also
Rosiere, Wisconsin on the Door Peninsula, site of the Rosiere Wind Farm

References

Townships in Delta County, Michigan
Townships in Michigan
Michigan populated places on Lake Michigan